Live Oak Brewing Company located in Austin, Texas, is a locally owned and operated brewery.  The brewery produces four year-round beers as well as nearly 20 more seasonal (or limited release) beers.  Live Oak beers are available on draft across Texas at bars and restaurants. In 2016, Live Oak began canning their beers for retail sale at grocery, liquor, and convenience stores across the state.

While Live Oak uses industry standard step mashing for most of their beers, they use a more difficult and rarely used old world style of mashing known as decoction mashing for a few of their beers, most notably the Live Oak Pilz and the Oaktoberfest.

Live Oak uses large, horizontal dairy tanks as fermenting vessels instead of the more traditional cylindroconical fermenters.

From 1997 to 2015, the brewery was run out of rented industrial space on East 5th Street in central Austin. Construction of the new facility took 11 months.

The Live Oak Brewing Company Taproom & Biergarten is family-friendly and open to the public, home of The Black Forest food truck, group events, public brewery tours, beer release parties, art markets, trivia nights, beer and food events, Rolling Roadshows, and more.

In 2018, Chip and head-brewer, Dusan Kwiatkowski, traveled to Grodzisk Wielkopolski, Poland, to learn more about the beer-making traditions of the Grodziskie style beer. Together with Browar Grodzisk a collaboration beer was born, Grodziskie Imperialne, with stronger notes of oak smoke and bitterness exceeding the Grodzisk standards.

In 2019, Live Oak Brewing took home a bronze medal from The Great American Beer Festival for their Hefeweizen.

References

External links

 Live Oak Brewing Company - Official Website
 Live Oak Brewing on YouTube

Culture of Austin, Texas
Beer brewing companies based in Texas
Manufacturing companies based in Austin, Texas
American companies established in 1997
1997 establishments in Texas